Anna Munroe (born September 11, 2001) is a Canadian curler from Quebec City, Quebec.

Career
Munroe made her first national appearance in 2017 at the 2017 Canadian U18 Curling Championships as second for Gabrielle Lavoie. After a 5–3 round robin record, her team lost in the semifinals against New Brunswick's Justine Comeau. They rebounded in the bronze medal game, defeating Nova Scotia's Cally Moore to claim the bronze medal. Team Lavoie surprised many at the 2019 Quebec Scotties Tournament of Hearts where they took the provincial title by defeating 2018 champion Émilia Gagné in the final. At the 2019 Scotties Tournament of Hearts, the Quebec team struggled, ultimately finishing the week in last place with a 0–7 record. However, Munroe, at age 17, officially became the youngest competitor to ever play in the event. Anna Munroe spared for the Noémie Gauthier rink at the 2020 Canadian Junior Curling Championships. After a 6–4 round robin record, Quebec faced Alberta in a tiebreaker, which they lost, eliminating them from contention.

Personal life
Munroe was previously an arts, literature and communications student at the Champlain College St. Lawrence. She is now enrolled at the University of Alberta and is studying Primary Education at Campus St. Jean.

Teams

References

External links

2001 births
Canadian women curlers
Living people
Curlers from Quebec
Sportspeople from Quebec City
Curlers from Alberta
University of Alberta alumni